Limitarianism refers to several different types of ethical theories. Though Limitarianism applies differently to varied fields of study, what is always common is an examination of when it is proper, moral or ethical to interfere and intervene in the lives and freedoms of individuals, in order to benefit society as a whole. It sometimes presents as a principle of distributive justice in economic theories ('Economic Limitarianism'). Unlike encompassing systems of political and economic intervention (socialism; fascism), which seek to make dramatic changes to the social order, Limitarianism deals with specific instances and subjects, for which the necessity and justification of intervention may be examined. As its name implies, Limitarianism asks the question of how setting certain limits for human beings can lead to positive outcomes.

Early uses of term 'Limitarianism'
The first known use of the term 'Limitarianism' seems to have been in early Christianity. Christian Theological Limitarianism teaches that Christ's atonement applies only to the elect (as Calvinism), and not to all humanity (as Christian universalism taught), or of limited atonement and irresistible grace as St. Augustine had taught.

Types of Limitarianism in philosophy, political Science and economics

Ethical Limitarianism 

Ethical Limitarianism is an ethical theory which (1) tries to be a partial account of distributive justice, (2) which belongs within the realms of politics rather than morality, (3) which is conceived and developed at the level of non-ideal theory, (4) which relies on an instrumental justification.

Democratic Limitarianism 
Democratic Limitarianism is a political theory which posits that governments have priority duties to 
their citizenry to protect it from risk and to ensure independence from fear. Based on such ideas, this political philosophy urges that governments should prioritize protecting the citizens against fear of death or injury from: 
 Domestic threats
 Foreign threats
 Social insecurity
 Environmental hazard

There exists a political movement which advocates for such ideas through principles of prioritization.

Economic Limitarianism
Economic Limitarianism is a school of thought in Economics which asserts that social improvement can be attained by the placement of a certain limit on personal wealth. Different modalities have been proposed for the regulation of such a limit. Economic Limitarianism differs from Socialism in that it does not negate the idea of private property, or completely bars the accumulation of wealth. It rather sets to determine and enforce a limit on the accumulation thereof, as means of creating a positive change in the economic system of a nation. 

Academic theorist Ingrid Robeyns has been promoting a formal of Economic Limitarianism which proposes a system of social justice via wealth distribution, which bears some similarities to Social Democracies and Socialism. Robeyn's idea of Economic Limitarianism states that it is morally impermissible to be (excessively) rich (i.e., have more economic resources than a certain level).  The Ethical-Economic Limitarianism of Robeyns would contrast with this view of Democratic Limitarianism. In 2016, the European Research Council awarded Robeyns a grant of 2 million Euros for conducting a 5-year research study on Limitarianism. 

Author Jonathan Bluestein has proposed a type of Economic Limitarianism called 'Prosperism'. Differing from Robeyns' approach, the system of Prosperism calls for distribution of wealth based on more libertarian and capitalistic guidelines. While Robeyns' philosophy argues that both income and wealth should be limited and regulated, and views excess enrichment as 'immoral', Bluestein's approach demands only that wealth be limited, without a restriction of income, and does not condone enrichment altogether.

Although the term 'Economic Limitarianism' is a relatively new one, the origins of the concept could be argued to have already been extant in the Old Testament, and possibly before that. The Old Testament presents a form of 'taxation' known as a 'Tithe', which is equal to 10% of the crop of a farmer. A First Tithe (10%) was to be paid to the priests of the tribe of Levi, and the Second Tithe (another 10%) was in some years to be given to the poor. Thus, the Tithe can be thought of as an intentional limit placed on the accumulation of wealth. The First Tithe is akin to Robeyns' Limitarianism, which supports a deliverance of excess wealth to the Bureaucracy, while the Second Tithe is more reminiscent of Bluestein's Prosperism, which proposes that those who amass wealth ought to share, but should have a choice with respect to whom to share it with. Both types of Tithe differ from modern-day Taxation in that they serve purposes other than enriching a State so that it could serve its citizenry.

Response and criticism
In the year 2021, two articles were published in the Penn Journal of Philosophy Politics and Economics, Volume 16, providing academic analysis of Economic Limitarianism from different points of view. The articles specifically tackled the version of Economic Limitarianism promoted by Robeyns, and referred to her work.

In the first article of the two, Karl Meyer proposed extending Robeyns' theories by applying them to corporations. Meyer posited that the problems raised by Robeyns with regard to excess of wealth, were not limited to individuals, but rather were also characteristic of corporations. Thus, it was Meyer's opinion that the wealth of corporations should also be subjected to limitarian laws and regulations.

The second article of the two, written by Timothy J. Nicklas, criticizes Robeyns' views. Nicklas addresses two of Robeyns' claims concerning the benefits of Economic Limitarianism, specifically that:  1. It is possible to determine a wealth limit which objectively encapsulates what is necessary for a "what is needed to have a flourishing life", and 2. That Limitarianism would improve the Democratic process. Nicklas is not convinced that there could be an over-arching objective economic measure of people's financial needs to assert a 'good life', a criticism already raised earlier by Bluestein. Nicklas also pointed out, that the striving for political power and the abuse thereof shall continue, even if there had been a limit placed on individual wealth.

Similar and related modalities

Socialism and communism
Socialism and communism can be thought of as extreme forms of Economic Limitarianism. They call for a revolutionary nationalization of individual wealth and property, as well as the complete or very expansive abolition of private property, as means of creating greater social equity. Limitarianism differs from them in that it still tolerates a certain level of inequality.

Sufficientarianism
Sufficientarianism is a school of thought in social justice, economics and philosophy, which strives to determine what are the supposed basic needs that should be allotted to human beings in order to guarantee social equity, or at least equality of opportunity. Such questions which are asked by Sufficientarianism, have historically been an integral part of democractic theory and socialist theory, as in both exist the belief that the State has a duty to provide the citizenry with certain 'needs' and 'rights'. Both Sufficientarianism and Limitarianism revolve around the topics of social equity and equality of opportunity. However, while Sufficientarianism deals with questions regarding what people should have or need to be granted, Limitarianism examines how to place limits of excess on accumulation of wealth.

See also
 Economic interventionism
 Ethics in religion
 Humanitarian intervention
 Liberation theology
 Maximum wage
 Rule of rescue
 Virtue ethics

References

Ethical codes
Ethical principles
Normative ethics
Ethics
Political ideologies
Political philosophy
Political neologisms
Political advocacy groups by continent